Marc Parenteau (born December 4, 1980 in Sherbrooke, Quebec) was a professional Canadian football offensive lineman who last played for the Winnipeg Blue Bombers of the Canadian Football League. He was drafted 36th overall by the Ottawa Renegades in the 2003 CFL Draft. He was signed by the Saskatchewan Roughriders to a contract on February 12, 2007 where he played in 3 Grey Cup Championships (2007 (win), 2009 (loss), 2010 (loss)) and played for five seasons before being released on February 10, 2012. He was soon after signed by the Toronto Argonauts on February 13, 2012  Parenteau quickly established himself as a starter along the offensive line for the Argos and went on to win the 100th Grey Cup with them.  On September 9, 2013, Parenteau was traded to the Winnipeg Blue Bombers, along with a 3rd round draft pick in 2014, in exchange for running back Anthony Woodson and a fifth round draft pick in 2014.  To focus on his growing real estate business he retired from the CFL after 9 years in January 2014  after winning 2 Grey Cups (2007 & 2012) and playing in over 130 CFL games.  To this day he is the only offensive lineman to ever score a touchdown in a Grey Cup game (2010).  Before his CFL career, Marc was a 2 time All-Star (All Big East) lineman with the Boston College Eagles from 1999-2003.  He has become an award winning real estate agent in Ottawa Ontario where he has been rated as the city's Top Agent since 2018.

References

External links
 Marc Parenteau. Canadian Football League. Accessed 2011-01-05.
 Backup lineman very valuable. Canada.com (Regina Leader-Post), July 12, 2007. Accessed 2011-01-05.
 Riders' Marc Parenteau laughs about first catch. Canada.com (Regina Leader-Post), October 28, 2010. Accessed 2011-01-05.

1980 births
Boston College Eagles football players
Canadian football offensive linemen
French Quebecers
Living people
Ottawa Renegades players
Saskatchewan Roughriders players
Sportspeople from Sherbrooke
Toronto Argonauts players
Winnipeg Blue Bombers players